The Shivwits Plateau is a large plateau in northwest Arizona, and in the northwest of the Grand Canyon region. Just like the Kaibab Plateau in the east Grand Canyon forces the course of the Colorado River encircling it, the Shivwits Plateau is the major course changer of the Colorado in west Grand Canyon. The Colorado River goes due-south on the east perimeter of the plateau, goes west, then northwest to its outfall at Lake Mead. The southwest of the plateau borders the Colorado, but a lower elevation section is directly riverside; it is lower elevation hills and small canyons, called Sanup Plateau, and bordering the section of the Colorado called the Lower Granite Gorge. (The Lower Granite Gorge starts on the east side at the start of its due-south excursion around Shivwits Plateau.)

The Shivwits Plateau is named for the Shivwits section of the Paiute Indian tribes. The plateau is also one of the major areas of the Grand Canyon-Parashant National Monument that is bordered by the Lake Mead National Recreation Area (west), the Hualapai Indian Reservation (southeast), and Grand Canyon National Park (east).

Geography
The southwest, south, and southeast around the plateau is composed of the Hualapai Indian Reservation along the course of the Colorado River, the section named the Lower Granite Gorge. The north section is enclosed within Grand Canyon National Park and the Grand Canyon-Parashant National Monument.

The Hurricane Cliffs are on the east and the Grand Wash Cliffs are at the west.

See also
 Grand Canyon-Parashant National Monument

References

 Arizona Atlas & Gazetteer, DeLorme, Fourth Ed. 2001 pp. 21, 29–30

External links

 Mount Dellenbaugh, coordinates & elevation at topozone.com

Mohave County, Arizona
Plateaus of Arizona